West Salem is a village in Wayne County, Ohio. The population was 1,464 at the time of the 2010 census. West Salem is served by a branch of the Wayne County Public Library. The noted drag racing track Dragway 42 is located nearby.

History
West Salem was laid out in 1834.

Geography
West Salem is located at  (40.971656, -82.109731).

Demographics

2010 census
As of the census of 2010, there were 1,464 people, 558 households, and 393 families living in the village. The racial makeup of the village was 97.8% White, 0.1% African American, 0.1% Native American, 1.0% from other races, and 1.0% from two or more races. Hispanic or Latino of any race were 2.1% of the population.

There were 558 households, of which 38.7% had children under the age of 18 living with them, 48.0% were married couples living together, 14.2% had a female householder with no husband present, 8.2% had a male householder with no wife present, and 29.6% were non-families. 23.7% of all households were made up of individuals, and 7.7% had someone living alone who was 65 years of age or older. The average household size was 2.62 and the average family size was 3.00.

The median age in the village was 37.1 years. 27.1% of residents were under the age of 18; 8% were between the ages of 18 and 24; 27% were from 25 to 44; 27.2% were from 45 to 64; and 10.9% were 65 years of age or older. The gender makeup of the village was 50.6% male and 49.4% female.

2000 census
As of the census of 2000, there were 1,501 people, 573 households, and 389 families living in the village. The population density was 1,453.1 people per square mile (562.7/km). There were 620 housing units at an average density of 600.2 per square mile (232.4/km). The racial makeup of the village was 97.34% White, 0.13% African American, 0.27% Native American, 0.40% Asian, 0.20% Pacific Islander, 0.33% from other races, and 1.33% from two or more races. Hispanic or Latino of any race were 0.93% of the population.

There were 573 households, out of which 39.6% had children under the age of 18 living with them, 51.7% were married couples living together, 12.2% had a female householder with no husband present, and 32.1% were non-families. 27.2% of all households were made up of individuals, and 10.3% had someone living alone who was 65 years of age or older. The average household size was 2.62 and the average family size was 3.19.

In the village, the population was spread out, with 31.0% under the age of 18, 7.5% from 18 to 24, 32.8% from 25 to 44, 19.3% from 45 to 64, and 9.5% who were 65 years of age or older. The median age was 32 years. For every 100 females there were 100.1 males. For every 100 females age 18 and over, there were 96.2 males.

The median income for a household in the village was $36,563, and the median income for a family was $41,250. Males had a median income of $31,393 versus $20,947 for females. The per capita income for the village was $14,309. About 6.4% of families and 7.9% of the population were below the poverty line, including 8.2% of those under age 18 and 11.0% of those age 65 or over.

Notable people
Dean Chance, major league baseball pitcher   
J.A. Hines, member of the Wisconsin State Assembly 
Zeola Hershey Misener, suffragist and one of the first women elected to the Indiana General Assembly
Jacob Parrott, Civil War Medal of Honor recipient, 1862

Ben Nichols, Founder of Wayne County Sports 

John M. Runkle Jr, Army Ranger killed in Afghanistan in 2011

References

External links
 West Salem branch library website
 Dragway 42 website

Villages in Wayne County, Ohio
Villages in Ohio